John Edmunde Spiers (born 4 August 1947) is a former New Zealand rugby union player. A prop, Spiers represented Counties at a provincial level, and was a member of the New Zealand national side, the All Blacks, between 1976 and 1981. He played 28 matches for the All Blacks including five internationals.

References

1947 births
Living people
New Zealand rugby union players
New Zealand international rugby union players
Counties Manukau rugby union players
Rugby union props
Rugby union players from Auckland